Sim Shalom ("Grant Peace") is a blessing that is recited at the end of the morning Amidah and the Mincha Amidah during fast days in the Ashkenazic tradition, and on mincha of the Sabbath in the Western Ashkenazic rite and most communities in Israel; during the evening service and the Mincha servicer of non-fast days (or sabbath according to some traditions), a different version of this prayer, Shalom Rav, is said instead. In the Sefardic, Nusach Sefard, Nusach Ari, Italian Nusach and Romaniote rites, Sim Shalom is said at all prayer services. In Provence tradition, Shalom Rav was recited in all prayers.

Text

External links
View Song: Sim Shalom שִׂים שָׁלוֹם

A "Six13" song  on YouTube in the spirit on the Sim Shalom blessing
Musical work for Cantor and Choir (2017) by Gilad Hochman on the Sim Shalom blessing

References

Jewish blessings
Hebrew words and phrases in Jewish prayers and blessings